Saint-Maugan (Gallo: Saent-Maugant) is a commune in the Ille-et-Vilaine department in Brittany in northwestern France.

Geography
The commune is traversed by the Meu river.

Population
Inhabitants of Saint-Maugan are called malganais in French.

See also
Communes of the Ille-et-Vilaine department

References

External links

Mayors of Ille-et-Vilaine Association 

Communes of Ille-et-Vilaine